Liolaemus fuscus (brown tree iguana) is a species of lizard in the family Iguanidae.
It is found in parts of western Argentina and central Chile in the Chilean matorral ecoregion. The conservation status of this iguana is classified as Data Deficient (DD).

References
 C. Michael Hogan & World Wildlife Fund. 2013. Chilean matorral. ed. M.McGinley. Encyclopedia of Earth. National Council for Science and the Environment. Washington DC

Line notes

fuscus
Lizards of South America
Reptiles of Argentina
Reptiles of Chile
Chilean Matorral
Reptiles described in 1885
Taxa named by George Albert Boulenger
Taxonomy articles created by Polbot